The Judas Table is the sixth album by the UK band Antimatter. It was released on 9 October 2015. In January 2020, The Judas Table was voted the number 1 'Album of the Decade' (2010's) by Dead Rhetoric's David E. Gehlke  as well as being among the 'Top 25 Progressive Metal Albums Of The Decade' by Dutch Progressive Rock Page's Andy Read

Track listing 
All songs written by Mick Moss

Credits 
Music and lyrics: Mick Moss – lead vocals, solo & electric guitar, keyboards and samples
Guest appearances: Ste Hughes (Bass), Rachel Brewster (Violin), Jenny O'Connor (Additional Vocals) and Liam Edwards (Drums)
Artwork: Mario Nevada

References

External links 
 Official site

 

2015 albums
Antimatter (band) albums